Čisti Breg is a small settlement on the left bank of the Krka River in the Municipality of Šentjernej in southeastern Slovenia. The area is part of the traditional region of Lower Carniola. It is now included in the Southeast Slovenia Statistical Region.

References

External links
Čisti Breg on Geopedia

Populated places in the Municipality of Šentjernej